McIntosh Point is a hamlet in the Canadian province of Saskatchewan. It is located at McIntosh Point on the western shore of Emma Lake.

See also 
List of communities in Saskatchewan

References 

Unincorporated communities in Saskatchewan
Lakeland No. 521, Saskatchewan
Division No. 15, Saskatchewan